Mark Brake (born 31 October 1958) is a Welsh author, broadcaster and former professor of science communication at the University of Glamorgan.

Education 
Brake was born at Mountain Ash, Wales, UK.  He was awarded a BSc by the University of Glamorgan and a MSc by University College Cardiff in 1988.

Public Engagement with Science 
In 1999, Brake established what he described as 'the world's first science fiction degree', and in 2000, as Head of Earth and Space Sciences at The University of Glamorgan, was involved with an initiative to introduce school children to the study of astrophysics. The following year, Russian cosmonauts Commander Aleksandr Aleksandrovich Volkov and Alexandre Martynov toured Britain in a series of lectures organised by Brake's department. In 2005, Brake helped establish, and became head of, a degree in Astrobiology, described by a fellow academic as the UK's first full degree in the subject. Between 2003 and 2008, Brake was responsible for leading public engagement initiatives in science, which attracted around £5 million of funding.  The RoCCoTO project, launched in 2001, was a community-based science course for the public, featuring ideas about science and their cultural context in an instance of "Third Culture" studies.  The RoCCoTO project received a Public Engagement Award from the Astrobiology Society of Britain in 2008.  Alien Worlds, an award-winning multimedia website associated with the RoCCoTO project was launched in July 2009.  The website is an animated guide to phenomena such as eclipses of the Sun and Moon, and demonstrates Earth's place in a cosmic perspective through advanced, animated visuals. More recently, Brake has co-written and co-hosted a series of live tours with educational rapper Jon Chase, appearing at the 2012 Hay Festival with a show entitled The Science of Doctor Who, and the 2014 festival with The Science of Star Wars. Since 2016, Brake has been writing a series of 'Science of' books for Skyhorse Publishing.

False PhD Claim 
In 2006, Brake submitted a grant application to the Research Councils' Procurement Organisation in which he falsely claimed to have a PhD from Cardiff University. The University of Glamorgan described this as "an isolated incident." Brake continued to work at the University of Glamorgan as a professor of science communication until 2010.<ref>"The Writers of Wales Database: Brake, Mark" , Literature Wales'</ref>

 View on Darwin 

Brake has argued that Charles Darwin's theory of evolution, as expressed in his 1859 Origin of Species, was influenced by the work of Alfred Russel Wallace.  This view has been contested.

 Publications Different Engines: How Science Drives Fiction and Fiction Drives Science (2007) Futureworld: Where Science Fiction Becomes Science (2008) Revolution in Science: How Galileo and Darwin Changed Our World (2009) Introducing Science Communication: A Practical Guide (2009) Space Hoppers (2010)  Really Really Big Questions About Space and Time (2010) The Alien Hunter's Handbook: How to Look for Extraterrestrial Life (2012) Alien Life Imagined: Communicating the Science and Culture of Astrobiology (2012) Mark Brake's Space, Time, Machine, Monster (2014) How to be a Space Explorer: Your Out-of-this-World Adventure (2014) Mark Brake’s Space, Time, Machine, Monster: Dr Who Edition (2015) The Science of Star Wars (2016) The Big Earth Book (2017) The Science of Harry Potter (2017) The Science of Superheroes (2018) The Science of Science Fiction (2018) The Science of The Big Bang Theory (2019) The Science of James Bond (2020) The Science of Doctor Who'' (2021)

References

External links 
Official Website

1958 births
Academics of the University of Glamorgan
Fellows of the Institute of Physics
Living people
People from Mountain Ash, Wales